Unit for First Response and Intervention - Alpha is a special police unit in North Macedonia.

See also
Special Operations Unit - Tigers
Border Police of North Macedonia
Lions (police unit)
Special Support Unit
Ministry of Internal Affairs
Police of North Macedonia
Lake Patrol

References

Specialist law enforcement agencies of North Macedonia